Hashtrud (Azerbaijani: سرسکند; also Romanized as Hashtrūd; also known as Āz̄arān, Sarāskand, Sar Eskand, Sar Eskandar, and Sar Eskand Khān) is a city in the Central District of Hashtrud County, East Azerbaijan province, Iran, and serves as capital of the county. Hashtrud is located 140 km from Tabriz, the capital of the province. The city is bordered by the Sahand mountains toward the west of the city, and is surrounded by several rivers, such as the Qranqvchay and Ozan Rivers.

At the 2006 census, its population was 18,418 in 4,493 households. The following census in 2011 counted 19,903 people in 5,376 households. The latest census in 2016 showed a population of 20,572 people in 6,056 households.

History 
Hashtrud is home to the Zahhak Castle, named after Zahhak in ancient Persian mythology. The castle was inhabited by various Persian dynasties until the Timurid era.

Before the 1979 Islamic Revolution, a census report recalls that Hashtrud was home to roughly 10 Jewish families.

External links
HAŠTRUD in Iranica

References 

Hashtrud County

Cities in East Azerbaijan Province

Populated places in East Azerbaijan Province

Populated places in Hashtrud County